San Mateo is a canton in the Alajuela province of Costa Rica. The head city is in San Mateo district.

History 
San Mateo was created on 7 August 1868 by decree 30.

Geography 
San Mateo has an area of  km² and a mean elevation of  metres.

The northern border of the elongated province is formed by the Jesús María, Machuca, Agua Agría, Calera rivers and Quebrada Zapote. The Quebrada Concepción, Grande de Tárcoles and the Machuca rivers establish the southern border. Cerro La Lana is a landmark that delineates a northeast tip of the canton.

Districts 
The canton of San Mateo is subdivided into the following districts:
 San Mateo
 Desmonte
 Jesús María
 Labrador

Demographics 

For the 2011 census, San Mateo had a population of  inhabitants.

Transportation

Road transportation 
The canton is covered by the following road routes:

References 

Cantons of Alajuela Province
Populated places in Alajuela Province